is a football (soccer) club based in Moriyama, which is located in Shiga Prefecture in Japan. They play in the Kansai Soccer League, which is part of Japanese Regional Leagues.

History 
The club was founded in 2005 under the denomination of Shiga FC; it quickly reached the Kansai Soccer League, despite having alternative form and results between 1st and 2nd division. In 2010, the name changed to Tojitsu Shiga FC, taking back though the will of aiming towards professional football.

The name changed again in 2011, when the club became Lagend Shiga FC: the denomination came from the mix of two English words, "Lake" (due to the presence of Lake Biwa in Shiga Prefecture) and "Legend", with a renovate will of reaching pro-football. In 2015 it was also mentioned a possible merger with MIO Biwako Shiga, but the deal was never completed and then abandoned in September.

In 2017, Lagend Shiga, alongside St. Andrew's University FC, were relegated to the 2nd division of the Kansai Soccer League, but bounced back in the following year, winning promotion to the 2019 Kansai Soccer League 1st Division. In 2020, they finished at the bottom of the league, but due to the COVID-19 global pandemic outbreak, there were no relegation or promotion between divisions in the Kansai Soccer League. Then, they were able to play the 2021 Kansai Soccer League in the 1st Division, finishing 6th in the league.

League record 

Key

Current squad

References

External links 
Official Site 
Official Facebook Page
Official Twitter Account

Football clubs in Japan
Sports teams in Shiga Prefecture
Association football clubs established in 2005
2005 establishments in Japan
Moriyama, Shiga